Occupation of Hungary by Nazi Germany may refer to

 Operation Margarethe, the occupation of Hungary by German forces on 19 March 1944
 Operation Panzerfaust, military operation to occupy Hungary in October 1944
 Government of National Unity (Hungary), puppet government formed by the Arrow Cross Party on 16 October 1944

See also 
 Hungary in World War II